Richie Brockel (born July 24, 1986) is a former American football fullback. He was signed by the San Diego Chargers as an undrafted free agent in 2010. He played college football for Boise State University and high school football for Greenway High School in Phoenix. He was also a member of the Carolina Panthers until 2015. After the 2015 NFL season, Brockel retired from the NFL.

Career statistics

External links
Boise State Broncos bio
Carolina Panthers bio

1986 births
Living people
Players of American football from Phoenix, Arizona
American football tight ends
Boise State Broncos football players
San Diego Chargers players
Carolina Panthers players